The 1932–33 NHL season was the 16th season of the National Hockey League (NHL). Nine teams each played 48 games. The New York Rangers beat the Toronto Maple Leafs three games to one for the Stanley Cup.

League business

After sitting out for a season due to financial difficulties, the Ottawa Senators rejoined the NHL. The Philadelphia Quakers never rejoined the NHL after sitting out the 1931–32 season.

Detroit Falcons were renamed as the Detroit Red Wings.

Although the Montreal Maroons had Flat Walsh, Dave Kerr and Normie Smith for goal, they were interested in acquiring Chuck Gardiner of Chicago. James Strachan offered $10,000 plus one of his goalkeepers, but there was no deal.

Billy Coutu, expelled from the NHL in 1927, was reinstated to the NHL, but never returned.

Rule changes
This season, the NHL started allowing a substitute to serve penalties for goaltender's penalties.

The NHL now required a captain or alternate captain to be on the ice at all times.

Regular season
There was a record number of four goaltenders who served as captains for their teams: George Hainsworth, Roy Worters, Charlie Gardiner, and Alex Connell. The Red Wings and Boston Bruins tied for the best overall record with 58 points apiece, but it was Boston that was awarded first overall due to a better head-to-head record. Ottawa started the season up in second place in the Canadian Division near the .500 mark at mid season, but collapsed in the second half and finished last. President Ahearn instructed coach Cy Denneny to fine players who displayed indifferent hockey. At the same time, he stated that Hector Kilrea was not for sale. Toronto manager Conn Smythe offered Andy Blair, Ken Doraty, and Baldy Cotton for Kilrea, which drew a snort of disdain from Ahearn.

The Montreal Canadiens, under new coach Newsy Lalonde, spent much of the season in last place, but made the playoffs when they rallied to finish third. Toronto, with its Kid line, finished first for the first time as the Maple Leafs. Led by the play of Eddie Shore, the Boston Bruins finished first in the American Division.

The first forfeit in NHL history occurred during a Black Hawks-Bruins game at Boston Garden on March 14, 1933. Chicago coach Tommy Gorman punched referee Bill Stewart following a disputed overtime goal by Boston's Marty Barry. Stewart threw several punches at Gorman before summoning the police to remove Gorman from the visitors' bench. The Hawks refused to continue the game without their coach. The puck was placed at center ice by Stewart. Boston's Cooney Weiland scored without any Hawks on the ice--at which point the game was forfeited to Boston. Ironically, referee Stewart would coach the Black Hawks to the Stanley Cup in 1937-1938.

Final standings

Playoffs

Playoff bracket

Quarterfinals

(A2) Detroit Red Wings vs. (C2) Montreal Maroons

(A3) New York Rangers vs. (C3) Montreal Canadiens

Semifinals

(A1) Boston Bruins vs. (C1) Toronto Maple Leafs
Game five of this series is the second longest game in NHL history, it was the longest at the time.

(A2) Detroit Red Wings vs. (A3) New York Rangers

Stanley Cup Finals

Awards
It was the first season that league president Frank Calder named the best rookie of the year. The first winner was Carl Voss of the Detroit Red Wings. Although Tiny Thompson was named 'most valuable goaltender', he was not named to the NHL All-Star team.

All-Star teams

Player statistics

Leading scorers
Note: GP = Games played, G = Goals, A = Assists, PTS = Points, PIM = Penalties in minutes

Source: NHL.

Leading goaltenders
Note: GP = Games played; Mins = Minutes played; GA = Goals against; SO = Shutouts; GAA = Goals against average

Source: NHL.

Coaches

American Division
Boston Bruins: Art Ross
Chicago Black Hawks: Emil Iverson and Tommy Gorman
Detroit Red Wings: Jack Adams
New York Rangers: Lester Patrick

Canadian Division
Montreal Canadiens: Newsy Lalonde
Montreal Maroons: Eddie Gerard
New York Americans: Bullet Joe Simpson
Ottawa Senators: Cy Denneny
Toronto Maple Leafs: Dick Irvin

Debuts
The following is a list of players of note who played their first NHL game in 1932–33 (listed with their first team, asterisk(*) marks debut in playoffs):
Art Wiebe, Chicago Black Hawks
Eddie Wiseman, Detroit Red Wings
Charlie Sands, Toronto Maple Leafs
Buzz Boll*, Toronto Maple Leafs
Bill Thoms, Toronto Maple Leafs

Last games
The following is a list of players of note that played their last game in the NHL in 1932–33 (listed with their last team):
George Owen, Boston Bruins
Billy Burch, Chicago Black Hawks, last active player from the Hamilton Tigers franchise. 
Reg Noble, Montreal Maroons
Hib Milks, Ottawa Senators
Harold Darragh, Toronto Maple Leafs

See also
1932-33 NHL Transactions
List of Stanley Cup champions
1932 in sports
1933 in sports

References
 
 
 
 
 

Notes

External links
Hockeydb.com 1932–33 season
NHL.com

 
1932–33 in Canadian ice hockey by league
1932–33 in American ice hockey by league